The 2010–11 season was Airdrie United's first season back in the Scottish Second Division, having been relegated from the Scottish First Division at the end of the 2009–10 season. They also competed in the Challenge Cup, League Cup and the Scottish Cup.

Summary
Airdrie United finished sixth in the Second Division. They reached the first round of the Challenge Cup, the second round of the League Cup and the fourth round of the Scottish Cup.

Management
Airdrie started the season under caretaker manager Jimmy Boyle following the sacking of Kenny Black during the summer. His appointment was later made permanent on 15 September 2011.

League table

Results and fixtures

Second Division

Challenge Cup

League Cup

Scottish Cup

Player statistics

Squad 

|}

See also
List of Airdrie United F.C. seasons

References

2010andndash;11
Airdrie United